Blue Mountains is an electoral district of the Legislative Assembly in the Australian state of New South Wales. It is represented by Trish Doyle of the Labor Party.

The 2004 redistribution of electoral districts estimated that the electoral district would have 45,289 electors on 29 April 2007. Since the 2007 election it has encompassed all of the City of Blue Mountains, except Glenbrook and Lapstone.

Members for Blue Mountains

Election results

See also
 List of Blue Mountains articles

References

Blue Mountains (New South Wales)
Electoral districts of New South Wales
1968 establishments in Australia
Constituencies established in 1968